The 2013 Claro Open Colombia was a men's professional tennis tournament played on outdoor hard courts. It was the first edition of the tournament, which was part of the 2013 ATP World Tour. It took place in Bogotá, Colombia at Centro de Alto Rendimiento, between 15 and 21 July 2013.

The Croatian Ivo Karlović was crowned first winner of the Claro Open Colombia after beating the Colombian Alejandro Falla in the final by 6-3 7-6(4) in a game that lasted one hour and 18 minutes. Karlovic was the surprise package of the 2013 edition, in a tournament that boasted the likes of the Serbian Janko Tipsarević and the South African Kevin Anderson.

In the doubles, the Indian couple formed by Purav Raja and Divij Sharan were crowned winners after defeating the Dutch Igor Sijsling and the French Édouard Roger-Vasselin by 7-6(4) and 7-6(3) in an hour and 30 minutes.

Singles main-draw entrants

Seeds 

 1 Rankings are as of July 8, 2013

Other entrants 
The following players received wildcards into the singles main draw:
  Nicolás Barrientos
  Carlos Salamanca
  Eduardo Struvay

The following players received entry from the qualifying draw: 
  Víctor Estrella
  Emilio Gómez
  Chris Guccione
  Juan Ignacio Londero

Withdrawals
Before the tournament
  Igor Andreev
  Denis Kudla
  Gilles Müller
  Rajeev Ram
  Michael Russell
  Jack Sock

Retirements
  Evgeny Korolev (illness)

Doubles main-draw entrants

Seeds 

 1 Rankings are as of July 8, 2013

Other entrants 
The following pairs received wildcards into the doubles main draw:
  Emilio Gómez /  Michael Quintero
  Alejandro González /  Carlos Salamanca
The following pair received entry as alternates:
  Marcelo Arévalo /  Víctor Estrella

Withdrawals
Before the tournament
  Xavier Malisse (illness)

Finals

Singles 

  Ivo Karlović defeated  Alejandro Falla,  6–3, 7–6(7–4)

Doubles 

  Purav Raja /  Divij Sharan defeated  Édouard Roger-Vasselin /  Igor Sijsling, 7–6(7–4), 7–6(7–3)

References

External links 
 

Claro Open Colombia
Claro Open Colombia
2013 in Colombian tennis